The subgenus Dudaica belongs to genus Drosophila and consists of two species, Drosophila malayana (Takada, 1976) and Drosophila senilis Duda, 1926.

References 

 Dudaica
Insect subgenera